The commune of Tangara is a commune of Ngozi Province in northern Burundi. The capital lies at Tangara.

The Tangara Commune is known for quality coffee cultivation at elevations from 1,700-1,900 metres asl.

References

Communes of Burundi
Ngozi Province